Ross Worswick (born 20 April 1989) in Manchester) is a British TV personality.

Worswick is best known for Ex on the Beach series 1 and 6, and Desi Rascals.

Television

References

1989 births
Living people
English television personalities
Mass media people from Manchester